Laurence D. Houlgate (born 1938) is an American philosopher, Emeritus Professor of Philosophy and former department chair at California Polytechnic State University. He specializes in the history of Western philosophy, social ethics, philosophy of law and political philosophy.  Houlgate was one of the first philosophers in the 20th century to theorize about the moral foundations of children's rights and the ethics of family relationships.  After his retirement, Professor Houlgate wrote a popular series of eight study guides on the classical philosophers for beginning philosophy students.   Houlgate also stood as the Democratic Party candidate for his district in the California State Assembly election of 2000 and California State Assembly election, 2002.

Publications

Books 

 Understanding Philosophy, 2nd edition: The Smart Student's Guide to Reading and Writing Philosophy, 2022.
Understanding Jean-Jacques Rouseau: The Smart Student's Guide to The Social Contract (Smart Student's Guides to Philosophical Classics, Book 8), 2021.
 Understanding Plato: The Smart Student's Guide to the Socratic Dialogues and The Republic (Smart Student's Guides to Philosophical Classics, Book 1)2016.
Understanding John Locke: The Smart Student's Guide to Locke's Second Treatise of Government (Smart Student's Guides to Philosophical Classics, Book 2) 2016.
Understanding John Stuart Mill: The Smart Student's Guide to Utilitarianism and On Liberty (Smart Student's Guides to Philosophical Classics, Book 3)
Understanding Immanuel Kant: The Smart Student's Guide to Grounding for the Metaphysics of Morals (Smart Student's Guides to Philosophical Classics, Book 4).
Understanding David Hume: The Smart Student's Guide to Dialogues Concerning Natural Religion and the essays Of Miracles, Of Immortality of the Soul, and Of Suicide (Smart Student's Guides to Philosophical Classics, Book 5)
Understanding Thomas Hobbes: The Smart Student's Guide to Leviathan (Smart Student's Guides to Philosophical Classics, Book 6)
Morals, Marriage, and Parenthood: An Introduction to Family Ethics 
Philosophy, Law and the Family: A New Introduction to the Philosophy of Law (AMINTAPHIL: The Philosophical Foundations of Law and Justice)
The Child and the State: A Normative Theory of Juvenile Rights
Family and State: The Philosophy of Family Law
Children's Rights, State Intervention, Custody And Divorce:  Contradictions in Ethics And Family Law (Problems in Contemporary Philosophy)

Articles and Reviews 

 “Family Ethics,” Eds. James J. Ponzetti Jr., Maureen Blankemeyer, Sean M. Horan, Heidi Lyons, Aya Shigeto. Macmillan Encyclopedia of Families, Marriages, And Intimate Relationships (Macmillan Reference, 2019).
 "John Locke on Immigration and Naturalization: Membership and Property in the State of Nature," Eds. Ann Cudd and Win-Chiat Lee, Immigration and Citizenship (New York: Springer International Publishing, 2016).
 "Family Law," in Christopher B. Grey, The Philosophy of Law: An Encyclopedia (New York:
 Garland, 1999), pp. 288–290.
 “Three Concepts of Children's Constitutional Rights: Reflections on the Enjoyment Theory," University of Pennsylvania Journal of Constitutional Law (Vol. 2, No. 1, 1999), pp. 77–94.. 
 "Children and Ethical Theory (revised)" in L. Becker and C. Becker, eds., Encyclopedia of Ethics, Second Edition (New York: Garland Pub. Co., 1999).
 "What is Legal Intervention in the Family? Family Law and Family Privacy," Law and Philosophy, vol. 17, no. 2 (March,1998), pp. 141–158.
 "Must the Personal be Political?  Family Law and the Concept of Family," The International Journal of Law, Policy and Family, volume 12 (1998), pp. 107–119.
 "Are Juveniles Still 'Persons' Under the United States Constitution?" (with Philip Fetzer), The International Journal of Children's Rights, vol. 5 (1997), pp. 319–339.
 "The Status of Children in a Liberal Society," Law and Philosophy, vol. 5, no. 1 (September, 1996).
 "Is Divorce Immoral?" in Christina Sommers and Fred Sommers, Vice and Virtue in Everyday Life, 4th ed. (New York: Harcourt, 1997).
 "Ethical Theory and the Family," in Diana T. Myers, K. Kipnis and C. Murphy, eds. Kindred Matters: Rethinking the Philosophy of the Family (Ithaca: Cornell University Press, 1994).
 "Children and Ethical Theory," in L. Becker and C. Becker, eds.  Encyclopedia of Ethics (New York: Garland Pub. Co., 1992).
 "Whose Child?  In re Baby M and the Biological Preference Principle," Logos, vol. 9, 1988. 
 "Divorce Child Custody Disputes," Journal of Divorce, Spring/Summer, 1987, pp. 15–26.
 "PMS, Mental Abnormality and Legal Responsibility," in B.E. Ginsburg and B.F. Carter, eds. Premenstrual Syndrome: Ethical and Legal Implications in a Biomedical Perspective (New York: Plenum Press, 1987).
 "Review: Wringe's Children's Rights: A Philosophical Study, Canadian Philosophical Reviews, vol. 3, 1983, pp. 253-54.    
 "Review:   Grisso's Juveniles Waiver of Rights, Ethics, vol.  94, 1982, pp. 336-37.
 "Children, Paternalism and Rights to Liberty," in Onora O'Neill and W. Ruddick, eds. Having Children: Philosophical and Legal Reflections on Parenthood (New York: Oxford University Press, 1982). Reprinted in: David A.J. Richards, ed. Readings on Justice and Society, 3rd Edition (Aspen, Colorado: Aspen Institute, 1987).
 "The Child as a Person: Recent Supreme Court Decisions," in W.  Aiken and H. LaFollette, eds. Whose Child?  Children's Rights, Parental Authority and State Power (New Jersey: Littlefield, Adams, 1980).
 "Medical Research Involving Children," Archives for Philosophy of Law and Social Philosophy, vol. 12, 1979, pp. 123–28. Reprinted in: Glasgow House Quarterly, vol. 1, pp. 27–38.
 "Rights, Health, and Mental Disease," Wayne Law Review, vol. 22, 976, pp. 87–95.
 "Excuses and the Criminal Law," Southern Journal of Philosophy, vol. 13, 1975, pp. 187–95.
 "Virtue is Knowledge," The Monist, vol. 54, 1970, pp. 142–53.
 "The Platonic Minos and the Classical Theory of Natural Law,” (with  R.F. Hathaway), American Journal of Jurisprudence, vol.14, 1969, pp. 105–24.
 "Knowledge and Responsibility," American Philosophical Quarterly, vol. 5, 1968, pp. 109–110.
 "Malcolm on Mind and the Human Form," Mind, vol. 77, 1968, pp. 584–87.
 "Ignorantia Juris: A Plea for Justice," Ethics, vol. 78, 1967, pp. 32–42. 
 "Mistake in Performance," Mind, vol. LXXV, 1966, pp. 257–261.
 "Acts Owing to Ignorance," Analysis, Vol. 27, 1966, pp. 17–22.
 "Causation, Recipes and Theory," Theoria, vol. 29, 1963, pp. 265–276.
 "The Paradigm Case Argument and 'Possible Doubt'," Inquiry, vol. 5, 1962, pp. 318–324.

Other Media 

 Podcasts.  Understanding Plato.  (Spreaker, 2021); Understanding John Locke (Spreaker, 2022)

 Audiobook. The Family, an audiobook in the series Morality in our Age: the Audio Classics Series (Knoxville: Knowledge Products, 1995).   Narrated by the actor Cliff Robertson.   Two cassettes, total playing time 2 1/2–3 hours.

Career 
Laurence Houlgate did his undergraduate work in philosophy at California State University, Los Angeles.  After the new degree in philosophy was approved by the administration in 1960, Houlgate was the first student to graduate from CSULA with a B.A. in Philosophy. His mentor was Professor Henry Alexander.  On his recommendation, Laurence enrolled as a graduate student at the University of California, Berkeley. He later transferred to the University of California, Los Angeles to study under H.L.A. Hart (who was there as a Visiting Professor) and Herbert Morris, one of Hart's students at Oxford and a recent appointee at UCLA.  Houlgate received his M.A. and Ph.D. degrees in Philosophy from UCLA in 1965 and 1967, having written his dissertation under Morris' direction.

Houlgate's first full-time appointment was as a lecturer in philosophy at California State University, Fullerton. After two years, he accepted  a position at the University of California, Santa Barbara (1966).  He accepted a visiting professorship for one year at Reed College (Oregon) (1972-1973), and later accepted an Associate Professor position at George Mason University (Virginia).  He remained at GMU for six years (1973-1979) and in 1979, accepted a position at California Polytechnic State University, San Luis Obispo, where he was appointed Professor of Philosophy (1980) and served as department chair from 1990 to 1995.  He retired from full-time teaching at Cal Poly, SLO  in 2002 but continued part-time until 2016.

Professor Houlgate's first published works were in the area of philosophy of law.  He wrote his Ph.D. dissertation on the general topic of excuses in criminal law, with a special emphasis on the excuses of mistake and ignorance of fact.  He later published several articles in philosophical journals based on chapters in the dissertation (see Articles and Reviews, above).

In the next stage of his career, Houlgate spent one academic year as a fellow at the University of Virginia School of Law.  He did research on the legal rights of children and later published one of the first philosophical books on this topic (The Child and the State).  In subsequent years, he turned to the study of the philosophical foundations of family law and the ethics of family relationships.  This research led to a monograph on the philosophy of family law (Family and State), a reader on family ethics (Morals, Marriage and Parenthood), and a collection of his previously published articles (Children's Rights, State Intervention, Custody And Divorce:  Contradictions in Ethics And Family Law).

In his post-retirement years, Houlgate twice ran for and won elections to be the Democratic Party candidate for the California State Assembly. He later twice lost the general election to the incumbent, as had every Democratic candidate in his district during the previous 50 years.

In 2016, Professor Houlgate decided to keep a promise to his former students to write a series of study guides on the classical philosophers.  There are now eight of these guides, published as a series under the title The Smart Student's Guides to Philosophical Classics.  He also kept a promise to  his colleagues who teach courses in the philosophy of law to write a textbook based exclusively on family law cases.  That book was published in 2016 under the title Philosophy, Law and Family: A New Introduction to the Philosophy of Law.  The book is published by Springer Nature International.

Read more about Houlgate's life and post-retirement activities in U.S. Masters and U.S. Senior Games swimming competition at https://indd.adobe.com/view/8ce99641-b409-41fe-bca0-d34fb5f71ee9  (follow the arrow to frame #10).

References

 

1938 births
Living people
21st-century American philosophers
Political philosophers
Philosophy academics
California State University, Los Angeles alumni
California Polytechnic State University faculty
Candidates in the 2002 United States elections
Candidates in the 2000 United States elections
Philosophers of law